Dolores Claiborne is a 1992 psychological thriller novel by Stephen King. The novel is narrated by the title character. Atypically for a King novel, it has no chapters, double-spacing between paragraphs, or other section breaks; thus, the text is a single continuous narrative, which reads like the transcription of a spoken monologue. It was the best-selling novel of 1992 in the United States. The story introduced the fictional community of Little Tall Island, which Stephen King later used as the setting for the original TV mini-series Storm of the Century.

The novel was highly successful in 1992 and received overall positive reviews. It led to a successful 1995 movie adaptation starring Kathy Bates that Time named among the top 10 greatest Stephen King film adaptations in 2013. A two-act opera adaptation premiered in San Francisco in 2013, followed by a new version of the same opera in 2017.

Plot summary
Dolores Claiborne, an opinionated 65-year-old widow living on the tiny Maine community of Little Tall Island, is suspected of murdering her wealthy, elderly employer, Vera Donovan. The novel is presented as a transcript of her statement, told to the local constable and a stenographer. Dolores wants to make clear to the police that she did not kill Vera, whom she has looked after for years, but does confess to orchestrating the death of her husband, Joe St. George, almost 30 years before. Dolores's confession develops into the story of her life, her troubled marriage, and her relationship with her employer. 

She first describes her relationship with her employer, which began when Vera and her millionaire husband purchased a summer home on Little Tall Island in 1949 and hired Dolores as a maid. Able to cope with Vera's brutally exacting standards, Dolores rises from maid to housekeeper at the Donovan home. After Vera's husband dies in a car crash in the late '50s, Vera spends increasing time at her island house, eventually moving there permanently. Vera suffers a series of strokes in the 1980s, whereupon Dolores becomes the woman's live-in caretaker and reluctant companion. As the wealthy woman slips into dementia, Dolores comforts her from terrifying hallucinations of a force she calls "the dust bunnies." When Vera is lucid, Dolores combats her increasing mind games and power plays. 

Dolores further reveals that when she began working at the Donovan house, her marriage to Joe St. George was already in distress due to his alcoholism, as well as verbal and physical abuse. Their children, Selena, Joe Jr., and Pete, are unaware of the abuse. The marriage problems escalate one night in 1960 when Joe viciously hits Dolores in the small of her back with a piece of stove wood over a perceived slight. In retaliation, Dolores smashes a ceramic cream pot over his head and threatens him with a hatchet, swearing she will kill him if he ever strikes her again. This confrontation is witnessed by their teenaged daughter, Selena. Joe stops beating Dolores, and she allows him to leave the island community in an effort to save face. Selena does not realize Dolores was abused and acted in self-defense, and Joe uses the hatchet incident to gain sympathy from her. A rift grows between mother and daughter.

In 1962, Dolores notices Selena has become increasingly withdrawn, frightened, unsociable and neglectful of her appearance. After speculating she has met a boy or become involved in drugs, Dolores finally confronts her daughter as they return home on the island ferry. She explains the truth of the hatchet incident and, against her wishes, Selena then admits her father molested her. Overwhelmed, Selena nearly jumps off the side of the ferry, but Dolores stops her and comforts her, vowing to protect her. That night, she considers murdering Joe, describing the urge to kill him as the opening of an "inside eye." Instead, she confronts him, promising to have him arrested if he ever touches Selena again. Dolores then resolves to protect her children by leaving Joe. When she attempts to withdraw her children's savings accounts to fund their escape, she discovers Joe has stolen everything she had saved. In despair, she breaks down crying at work, confiding in Vera. An unusually sympathetic Vera reveals she has had some sort of experience with Dolores' "inside eye", and casually remarks that men like Joe often die in accidents, leaving their wives everything. As she departs, she implies she arranged the car crash that killed her own husband and advises Dolores "sometimes, an accident can be an unhappy woman's best friend."

Dolores begins plotting Joe's death, but she does not find an opportunity to execute her plan until the summer of 1963. Vera becomes obsessed with a total solar eclipse that will be visible from the island, convinced the event will convince her estranged children to visit her. She plans a massive viewing party on the island ferry. Knowing the island will be mostly empty at that time, Dolores ensures Selena is sent to camp, and Joe Jr. and Pete are sent on a trip to visit family. Dolores marks the location of a dried-up stone well in a patch of brambles on the edge of their property. When it becomes clear her children will not be joining her during this time, Vera becomes despondent and lashes out at her hired help, calming only after Dolores confronts her over the unjust firing of one of the maids. 

On the day of the eclipse, Dolores buys Joe a bottle of scotch and makes him a sandwich, getting him drunk and comfortable, and they share a moment of physical affection for the first time in many years. As the eclipse begins, Dolores has a vision of a young girl in the path of the eclipse who is being sexually abused by her father at that same moment. Reminded of what she has set out to do, she deliberately enrages Joe by claiming she has recovered the money he had stolen, provoking him into attacking her. She flees into the brambles, leading Joe to the well and tricking him into stepping on the rotted boards that cover it. The planks break, and he falls into the well, but is not instantly killed. He calls out for help for some time before eventually losing consciousness. Dolores returns to the house and falls asleep. She has a nightmare, then checks the well. She arrives to discover Joe has regained consciousness and has nearly managed to climb out. He grabs at Dolores and attempts to pull her in with him. She hits him in the face with a rock, and he falls back into the well, dead.

Dolores reports Joe missing, and his body is found after several days of searching. Joe's death is ruled an accident despite the suspicions of the local coroner and rumors. Dolores is free of Joe, but her actions damage her relationship with Selena, who also suspects her mother killed her father.

The narration finally comes to the circumstances of Vera's death, an incident which has led Dolores to tell her story. She confesses that Vera, in one of her hallucinations, managed to exit her wheelchair and fled in terror from "the dust bunnies", falling down a flight of stairs. As Vera falls, Dolores has a terrifying vision of Joe's ghost, covered in dust. Somehow alive and lucid despite her injuries, Vera begs Dolores to help end her suffering. Dolores fetches a rolling pin, but Vera dies before she can use it. The incriminating scene is discovered by the local mailman, who suspects Dolores of killing the old woman and forces her to call the police. That night, Dolores is harassed and threatened by members of the island community who believe she has already escaped punishment for murder in the past. The next day, Dolores receives a phone call from Vera's lawyer, who informs a shocked Dolores that she has inherited Vera's entire fortune—nearly $30 million. Dolores initially refuses the money in favor of Vera's estranged children, but then learns they were killed in a car crash in 1961, and Vera had spent the last 30 years of her life only pretending they were still alive. Knowing the inheritance will be seen as a motive for murder and worsen the case against her, Dolores convinces herself the only way to clear her name is to confess everything. Feeling at peace with herself at long last, she ends her statement. 

Several newspaper articles provide an epilogue to the story, revealing Dolores was cleared of any blame in Vera's death and anonymously donated Vera's fortune to the New England Home For Little Wanderers. The final article implies Dolores and Selena have reconciled and that Selena will be coming home for the first time in 20 years.

Style
Unlike many other works by King, little focus is given to the supernatural. Although several supernatural occurrences are implied, the only such events that clearly occur in the book are two telepathic visions of a nameless young girl sexually victimised by her father, which, along with the solar eclipse backdrop, form a link to King's novel Gerald's Game.

Characters

Dolores Claiborne - The novel's narrator and protagonist, she is a 65-year old housekeeper. Caustic but not embittered by a lifetime of hard work and suffering, she is forced to confront her past sins to clear her name of a murder she did not commit. Despite expressing disparaging sentiments against President Kennedy throughout the novel, she is disclosed to be a registered Democrat near the novel's end.

Vera Donovan - Dolores' employer and a demanding, high-handed woman (in Dolores' phrasing, "a high-riding bitch"), she has a fanatical devotion to her complicated household procedures and will fire her hired help for the smallest of mistakes; Vera unexpectedly becomes Dolores' only ally in her battle to free herself from Joe.  Vera is revealed to have orchestrated the car crash that killed her unfaithful husband. As an elderly woman, she suffers a series of strokes and spends the last years of her life in an increasingly addled state, and Dolores' position shifts from housekeeper to caretaker. When lucid, she gains amusement by inconveniencing Dolores anyway she can, even deliberately soiling herself and her bedding so Dolores will be forced to clean her. She suffers from terrifying visions and hallucinations she calls "the dust bunnies", which she implies take the form of her dead husband and children, and which eventually lead to her death.

Joe St. George - Dolores' husband, she marries him directly out of high school. Inconsistently employed, racist, and both verbally and physically abusive to his family, Joe eventually begins sexually abusing his daughter, which leads Dolores to kill him. His death is significantly more painful and prolonged than Dolores intended, and his suffering weighs heavily upon her.

Selena St. George - Dolores' and Joe's daughter, and extremely bright and friendly as a girl, she is an honor student by the time she is in high school. After witnessing her mother threaten her father at the age of 12, she misunderstands the situation and becomes more sympathetic to Joe, who takes advantage of her kindness and begins molesting her. She becomes withdrawn and verges on the edge of suicide before Dolores manages to put a stop to the abuse. After Joe's death, Selena directly asks her mother if she killed him, which Dolores denies, but Selena is left questioning her mother's guilt. As an adult, Selena moves to New York and becomes a well-known journalist, but struggles with alcoholism and becomes distant from her mother. The novel's epilogue implies that they are beginning to reconcile.

Joe St. George Jr. - Dolores and Joe's older son, he is harassed and belittled by his father for his intelligence, sensitivity, and lack of physical prowess, and by the time of Joe's death, his son actively despises him. When his father dies, he surprisingly takes it the hardest of the three children, struggling with guilt over his hatred for his father. As an adult, he becomes a state senator in Maine and has a close relationship with his mother.

Pete St. George - Dolores' youngest son, nine years old when his father dies, he is referred to as "little Pete" or "Petey" by his mother, he idolizes his father and begins to imitate him, getting into fights at school and using racial slurs he is too young to understand. As an adult, he enlists in the army and is killed in Saigon, Vietnam shortly before the end of the war.

Michael Donovan - Vera's husband, he is a millionaire airplane manufacturer. He is killed in a car crash outside Baltimore on the way back from his mistress' apartment, after Vera tampered with his brakes. 

Donald and Helga Donovan - Vera's children, they are last seen by Dolores in 1961, when Donald is 16 and Helga is 14, after an argument in which Vera refuses to let Helga get a driver's license. Dolores speculates that they were aware or suspicious of their mother's role in their father's death and may even have been blackmailing her. Vera spends years telling Dolores they are estranged and creates elaborate lies of their current careers and families, but after her death, it emerges that they had died several months after Dolores last saw them, having veered off the road in a car driven by Helga.

Ted Kenopensky - Vera's handyman and occasional lover, Dolores refers to him as "the Hunky". Dolores believes he conspired with Vera to kill her husband. He is killed in a car crash shortly after Vera's health begins to fail.

Mr. Pease - A banker, he unwillingly helps Dolores discover what Joe has done with the money he has stolen from her children's college funds. In doing so, he shares confidential information with her against regulations, and after Joe's death, he does not come forward to share his knowledge of Dolores' motives for murder, which Dolores believes is out of fear of his own culpability. 

Dr. John McAuliffe - The county medical examiner, he examines Joe's body. A small, fastidious Scotsman, he suspects Dolores of killing her husband and harshly interrogates her prior to the official inquest, nearly cornering her with discrepancies in her story. He is eventually forced to enter a verdict of accidental death, which he does unwillingly.  

Garrett Thibodeau - The town constable, he investigates Joe's death. Friendly, empathetic, and not too bright, he cannot help himself from derailing McAuliffe's interrogation of Dolores. As a result, she is not charged with Joe's death.

Sammy Marchant - The island's dimwitted mailman, he discovers Dolores standing over Vera's dead body. He immediately suspects her of murder and is responsible for the rumors that begin to spread, eventually convincing Dolores to make her confession to the police.

Andy Bissette, Nancy Bannister, and Frank Proulx - The police chief, stenographer, and officer, respectively, they are in the room listening to Dolores' confession. None of their dialogue is included in the novel, which is presented as a transcript of Dolores' statement, but Dolores frequently addresses them.

Reception

Adaptations
The novel was adapted into a 1995 film directed by Taylor Hackford. It starred Kathy Bates as Dolores, with Jennifer Jason Leigh as her daughter Selena, and Judy Parfitt as Vera Donovan.

David Joss Buckley adapted the novel for the stage. It was produced in Germany and France and nominated for Globe De Crystal by Paris Premiere, 2007.

Dolores Claiborne, the operatic adaptation of the novel composed by Tobias Picker to a libretto by J. D. McClatchy, premiered at San Francisco Opera on September 18, 2013, with Patricia Racette in the title role.

See also

 Solar eclipses in fiction

References

External links

1992 American novels
American thriller novels
American novels adapted into films
Novels adapted into operas
Novels by Stephen King
Viking Press books
Domestic violence in fiction
Incest in fiction
Mariticide in fiction
Feminist novels
Novels set in Maine
Novels about child sexual abuse